The eleventh series of The Great British Bake Off began on 22 September 2020. It was presented by returning host Noel Fielding and new host Matt Lucas, who replaced Sandi Toksvig, and was judged by returning judges Paul Hollywood and Prue Leith. The first three episodes were extended to 90 minutes instead of the usual 75 minutes. The bakers were announced on 15 September 2020.

Filming of the eleventh series was delayed by the COVID-19 pandemic; originally scheduled to take place in April 2020, it was pushed back to July 2020. Filming the series normally takes place over 12 or 13 weeks on the weekends, but due to the pandemic, the cast and crew had to live in a "self-contained biosphere" (Down Hall Hotel near Bishop's Stortford with a skeleton staff), and filming took place in a marquee tent in the garden of the hotel over a period of six weeks.  The contestants and crew had to undergo a period of self-isolation after filming had ended.

The series was won by Peter Sawkins, with Dave Friday and Laura Adlington finishing as the runners-up. Sawkins is the first Scottish winner of the programme, and also the youngest winner in the show's 10-year history, at the age of 20.

Series 11 was released on Netflix in the U.S. as Collection 8. It premiered on 25 September 2020, with each episode available three days after the UK air date.

Bakers

Results summary 

Colour key:

Episodes

Episode 1: Cake 
For the signature challenge, the bakers created an intricate Battenberg cake in two hours. The technical challenge set by Paul gave the bakers 90 minutes (1 1/2 hours) to bake six miniature pineapple upside-down cakes. At the end of the challenge, Sura, who saw a fly and was trying to brush it away, accidentally hit Dave's tray of six miniature cakes as he was setting them down, knocking four to the floor. Prue and Paul judged the better looking of the remaining two, assuming the rest were the same. In the showstopper challenge, the bakers created a 3-D cake bust depicting their personal celebrity hero, in four hours.

The broadcast of Episode 1 began at 8:15pm instead of 8:00pm, following Prime Minister Boris Johnson's address to the nation on the COVID-19 pandemic.  The episode began with a parody of the Johnson address by new presenter Matt Lucas.

Episode 2: Biscuits 
For the signature challenge, the bakers were tasked with making 36 identical chocolate florentines, in two hours. The technical challenge, set by Prue, required the bakers to make 12 hand-shaped coconut macaroons, six piped with a mango curd and the other six drizzled and filled with chocolate, in an hour and 45 minutes. For the showstopper challenge, the bakers were given four hours to create a beautiful molded 3D biscuit table setting representing a memorable meal they had in the past.

Episode 3: Bread 
The signature challenge tasked the bakers with making two freeform soda bread loaves, one savoury and one sweet, and an accompanying butter in 1 hour 45 minutes. The technical challenge, set by Paul, tasked the bakers with making 6 rainbow-coloured bagels in honour of the NHS, in two hours 45 minutes. For the showstopper challenge, the bakers were asked to create a large decorative bread plaque in the style of a traditional harvest festival sheaf, portraying the one thing in life they are most grateful for, in three hours 30 minutes.

Episode 4: Chocolate 
The signature challenge was back to basics as the bakers were asked to make 18 chocolate brownies, in 90 minutes. For the technical, Paul tasked the bakers with making a traditional Jewish bake: chocolate Babka, in two hours 30 minutes. In the showstopper challenge, the bakers were required to produce a spectacular two-tiered white chocolate celebration cake in four hours.

Episode 5: Pastry 
For the signature, the bakers were tasked with putting their own spin on Cornwall's national dish: the pasty, in two hours. The technical challenge, set by Prue, required the bakers to make six éclairs: three raspberry, and three salted caramel, in two hours 15 minutes. For the showstopper, the bakers were given the intricate task of making a sweet tart hidden under a latticed pastry cage, in three hours 45 minutes.

Episode 6: Japanese 
Week 6 was a Bake Off first as the bakers tackled Japanese week. The signature challenge tasked the bakers with making eight steamed buns, complete with a savoury or sweet filling and decoration, in two hours 30 minutes. For the technical challenge, Prue asked the bakers to make a Matcha Crepe Cake consisting of 12 layers of crepes sandwiched with a white chocolate ganache buttercream and strawberries, decorated with fresh fruits and edible flowers on top, in two hours. The showstopper gave the bakers four hours to produce a cake inspired by the kawaii culture in Japan, incorporating Japanese flavours.

This was the 100th episode of the Great British Bake Off throughout all seasons.

Episode 7: The '80s 
For the signature challenge, the bakers were asked to perform their own twist on eight classical quiches with two different styles. For the technical challenge, Paul asked the bakers to make six deep-fried, identical custard & jam finger doughnuts. For the showstopper challenge, the bakers were required to make an ice cream cake, which was considerably more difficult since it was the hottest day of the year.

Episode 8: Desserts 
The signature challenge tasked the bakers with making twelve mini baked cheesecakes, in two hours 30 minutes. For the technical challenge, Prue set a 17th-century bake: two Sussex pond puddings using suet pastry and served with creme anglaise, again in two hours 30 minutes. For the showstopper challenge, the bakers were given the enormous task of making a jelly art design cake, composed of an artistic jelly design, a mousse and a baked sponge element in four hours and 30 minutes.

Episode 9: Pâtisserie (Semi-final) 
The signature challenge required the bakers to make 12 Pâte à Savarin in two hours 45 minutes. The penultimate technical challenge, set by Paul, gave the bakers the challenging task of making a Danish Cornucopia cake (kransekake), in two hours 15 minutes. For the showstopper challenge, the bakers were given four hours 30 minutes to make 25 cube-shaped cakes that required the precision expected in pâtisseries.

Episode 10: Final 
For the final signature challenge, the finalists were tasked with making eight beautifully decorated custard slices, in two hours 30 minutes. For the final technical challenge, Prue asked the bakers to make eight identical walnut whirls — a cone of chocolate with marshmallow inside, a biscuit base, and topped with walnuts, in two hours. For the final showstopper challenge, the bakers were tasked with making a colossal, spectacular dessert tower with a large cake at the base and at least three sections to represent the different baking disciplines, in four hours 30 minutes.

The judges said this was the closest final in the history of the show. Peter is the youngest ever winner of the Great British Bake Off.

Specials

Two compilation episodes of The Great British Bake Off: Best Bits, showing highlights from the previous ten series, were shown in the weeks after the final.  These were followed by two further specials focusing on the previous 10 winners: The Great British Bake Off: The Winners. The first episode covered the first five champions, the second the last five.

Two specials were commissioned for the festive season:

The Great Christmas Bake Off 

The Great Christmas Bake Off features James Hillery from Series 8, Ruby Bhogal from Series 9, Jamie Finn and Rosie Brandreth-Poynter both from Series 10. An Extra Slice presenter Tom Allen took over Noel Fielding as co-host with Matt Lucas, as Fielding welcomed the birth of his second child prior to filming and was on paternity leave.

For the signature challenge, the bakers were given three hours to create 12 miniature panettones. Prue's technical challenge required the bakers to make a quick Christmas pudding (with mincemeat made from scratch), to be cooked in a microwave and served with a Crème anglaise, in one hour and 15 minutes. The showstopper challenge asked the bakers to make an illusion cake to depict their ultimate Christmas day feast, in four hours.

The Great New Year Bake Off 

The Great New Year Bake Off featured Helena Garcia and Henry Bird from Series 10 as well as Series 5 winner Nancy Birtwhistle and Series 9 winner Rahul Mandal, making it the first time in the show's history two former winners were featured competing against each other. Noel Fielding returned to host alongside Matt Lucas.

The signature challenge required the bakers to make a fruit crumble, served with a complementary ice cream, in two hours. Paul's technical challenge tasked the bakers with making 6 steamed bao buns with shredded crispy duck fillings, in two hours. To celebrate the 2021 New Year, the bakers were asked to make a cake celebrating their 21st birthday for the showstopper challenge, in four hours.

Ratings 

The premiere episode of the series had the best start for the show since it moved to Channel 4, with an average of 6.9 million viewers tuning in and peaking at 7.9 million according to overnight viewing figures. The weekly consolidated audience figure was reported to be 10.8 million, which increased to 11.2 million after viewers who watched on other devices were included. This is the highest rating for any series on Channel 4 in 35 years after the miniseries A Woman of Substance, which was watched by 13.9 million viewers in 1985. The overnight audience figure rose to an average of 9.2 million for the final, peaking at 10.4 million.  The consolidated audience figure for the finale was 11.5 million, the second highest for a commissioned programme in Channel 4 history, and the consolidated figure averaged at 10.6 million for the series.

In the US, collection 8 was ranked amongst the top 10 most-streamed shows in the US, according to Nielsen's streaming rankings for the week of October 12. With 674 million minutes streamed, the show was the 5th most watched program on Netflix for the week.

References 

Series 11
2020 British television seasons